Burek is the ninth studio album by Bosnian musician Dino Merlin. Burek was released in 2004. Three songs were featured as singles: "Burek", "Supermen" and "Ako Nastaviš Ovako". This album includes 15 tracks, many of which are new. The song "Supermen" is sung by Dino Merlin with a guest appearance by Željko Joksimović. Many of the songs on this album have also appeared on his Live Koševo 2004 album released in 2005. The other guest appearances on the Burek album include Nina Badrić on "Ti si mene", and Edo Zanki on "Verletzt".

Track listing

External links
Burek at Dino Merlin's official web site

Dino Merlin albums
2004 albums
Grand Production albums